Meray Dard Ko Jo Zuban Miley is a Pakistani drama serial directed by Adnan Ahmad, written by Bushra Ansari and produced by Momina Duraid It began airing from 23 June 2012 on Hum TV. The show was also broadcast in India on Zindagi under the title Bezubaan.

Plot
The story of "Meray Dard Ko Jo Zuban Miley" revolves around two friends, Ahmed Ali and Abdul Rehman. Ahmed Ali is a poor shopkeeper whose life is focused on the well-being and happiness of his family and the people around him. Abdul Rehman is an affluent owner of a prosperous engineering firm. As wealthy as he is, Abdul Rehman is kindhearted and unconcerned with status. Abdul Rehman and his wife, Zakia, are devoted to caring for their deaf and mute son, Arooj. Arfa, Ahmed Ali's youngest daughter, is in love with and engaged to her maternal cousin, Junaid - which leaves Aminah Ahmed Ali's eldest daughter, open for marriage.

On meeting Aminah, both Abdul Rehman and Zakia fall in love with her bubbly personality, and compassionate and patient nature. Ashamed to ask for Aminah's hand in marriage to Arooj in the beginning of their recently rekindled friendship with Ahmed Ali, Zakia asks her sister, Razia, for her daughter's, Neelam, hand in marriage. All is well until Zakia's brother-in-law, Kamran, launches a plan to rob Abdul Rehman and Zakia of their fortune through Neelam's marriage to Arooj. However, Neelam's marriage to Arooj does not happen. Neelam is uninterested in Arooj as she thinks he is boring because of his inability to speak and hear.

One morning when Razia cleans up Neelam's bedroom, she finds a pack of cigarettes. The stress of her husband's behavior and her daughter's detrimental lifestyle take a toll on Razia and she has a heart attack. Zakia stays at her house to take care of her and help her to recover. It is fully realized that Neelam lives a westernized lifestyle of drinking, smoking, dating, and premarital sex. One evening, she is found in her house by Zakia being physically intimate with her boyfriend, Shiraz. Later, she finds out she is pregnant with Shiraz's child. When she is found by her parents laying on her bed and holding her stomach, she reveals to her parents that she is pregnant with Shiraz's child. However, Kamran sees this is an opportunity to tell Zakia that Arooj has gotten Neelam pregnant and is forced to marry her. Throughout that day, Neelam tries to confront Shiraz about the situation, who had promised to marry her. However, she finds out Shiraz has told her lies about himself, his life, and their future, and has left for London. Pregnant and without Shiraz, she sees an abortion as her only escape route. While receiving an injection to start the process of her abortion, she passes out. When she is rushed to the hospital, she is pronounced dead.

Razia and Kamran are grief-stricken. Through his grief, Kamran realizes his wrongdoings and apologizes to Zakia for what he has done, and leaves Pakistan. Arfa is then sent to Karachi as she wishes to pursue further studies. Through the help of Junaid convincing her father, her father agrees to send her to live there. She resides with a classmate who lives the lifestyle of Neelam's. Salaar, Arfa's classmate and friend of the classmate she resides with has eyes on Arfa and even confesses to Samreen that he likes Arfa already knowing the fact that she is engaged to Junaid. Later after a few days when Arfa on Samreen's request goes to Salaar's house along with her, there Salaar puts tablets in her drink and offers it to her which later drugs her and Salaar rapes her brutally even when Arfa struggles and after the ordeal is hospitalized where Samreen is arrested by the police and Salaar is on the run. Arfa's condition brings depression into the family as Arfa continuously blames herself and finds no reason to live her life anymore. After, Aminah gives birth to Inaam and Arfa eventually marries Junaid through much convincing from her family members.

Arooj receives an opportunity to go to Bangkok to display his talent in photography and art, and on their way to the airport they meet with an accident. The accident leaves Arooj handicapped, spending the rest of his life in a wheelchair. Arfa even after marriage still thinks about the ordeal she went through and cannot forget what Salaar did to her sinks into depression and later gives birth to a daughter who soon dies out of negligence.

Years pass and Aminah meets Salaar, who calls himself Aazam under a new identity. They work together, and she is unaware of his original identity to her younger sister. Arfa gives birth to a son and promises to change and get out of her depression. Aazam proposes to Aminah, but Aminah rejects. Zakia, regretting Aminah's destiny of her marriage to Arooj, convinces Aminah to marry Aazam. When Arfa and Junaid arrive at the wedding, Arfa recognizes Aazam, originally Salaar the one who raped her and now going to be her sister's husband is shocked which gives her the flashbacks of Salaar smoking and then coming close towards her to rape her in his bedroom. Arfa reveals Aazam's identity and slaps him heavily for ruining her respect and her life and now again going to destroy her sister's and thus saves Aminah's life.

Cast

 Alishba Yousuf as Arfa
 Sarwat Gillani as Aminah
 Shehryar Munawar Siddiqui as Arooj
 Behroze Sabzwari as Ahmed Ali
 Lubna Aslam as Shamim
 Mohib Mirza as Junaid
Khalid Anum as Abdur Rehman
 Hamza Ali Abbasi as Salaar/Aazam
 Bushra Ansari as Zakia
 Saad Imran as Inam
 Anam Tanveer

References

External links
 Hum TV's official website
Meray Dard Ko Jo Zuban Miley Ebuzztoday.com

Hum TV original programming
Urdu-language television shows
2012 Pakistani television series debuts
Zee Zindagi original programming